John Feaver and Gilles Moretton were the defending champions, but Moretton did not compete this year. Feaver teamed up with Billy Martin and lost in the first round to Jean-Louis Haillet and Yannick Noah.

Andrés Gómez and Belus Prajoux won the title by defeating Jim Gurfein and Anders Järryd 7–5, 6–3 in the final.

Seeds

Draw

Draw

References

External links
 Official results archive (ATP)
 Official results archive (ITF)

1981 Grand Prix (tennis)
ATP Bordeaux